The paleback darter (Etheostoma pallididorsum) is a species of freshwater ray-finned fish, a darter from the subfamily Etheostomatinae, part of the family Percidae, which also contains the perches, ruffes and pikeperches. It is endemic to Arkansas, United States. It is only known to occur in the Caddo River and in Hallmans Creek, a tributary of the Ouachita River. This species inhabits headwaters and creeks where it lives in rocky, shallow pools and also in springs with plentiful vegetation growth.

See also 
 Arkansas saddled darter: darter endemic to the White River in Arkansas and Missouri
 Percina brucethompsoni: darter endemic to the Ouachita River in Arkansas

References

Etheostoma
Endemic fauna of Arkansas
Freshwater fish of the United States
Fish of the Eastern United States
Fish described in 1962
Taxonomy articles created by Polbot
Ouachita River